Dança dos Famosos 2023 is the twentieth season of the Brazilian reality television show Dança dos Famosos which premiered on March 19, 2023, at  (BRT / AMT) on TV Globo, following a cast reveal special that aired on March 12.

On March 6, 2023, host Luciano Huck announced that some changes were added this season, including a larger cast of 16 celebrities, rotating professional partners and team dances.

Cast
The first two celebrities (Guito and Heloísa Périssé) were confirmed on March 9, 2023.  The full lineup of celebrities and professionals were unveiled on March 12.

Elimination chart

Weekly results

Week 1 
Week 1 – Group stage
Style: Disco

Running order

Week 2 
Week 2 – Group stage
Style: TBA

Running order

References

External links
 Dança dos Famosos on Gshow.com

2023 Brazilian television seasons
Season 20